Daniel-Bek Abisoghomi Pirumyan (22 November 1861 – 1922) was an Armenian military commander who served in the Imperial Russian Army during World War I and in the army of the First Republic of Armenia. He was one of the commanders of Armenian forces at the Battle of Sardarabad. During the Turkish–Armenian War of 1920, he commanded the unsuccessful defense of Kars and was taken prisoner.

Biography
Daniel-Bek Pirumyan was born in 1861 in Nakhichevanik village of the Elisabethpol Governorate of the Russian Empire (now in the disputed region of Nagorno-Karabakh). He graduated from the public school in Shusha and began his service in the Imperial Russian Army in 1881 in Yerevan. He studied at the Tiflis Infantry School and the Infantry Officers' School in Oranienbaum Military Academy. He was promoted to the rank of lieutenant colonel in 1913 and colonel in 1915. During World War I, he fought on the Caucasus Front, commanding the 3rd Battalion of the 153rd Infantry Regiment in Western Armenia. During the Erzurum offensive, he captured the Turkish fort of Dalangez and then fought off the Turkish army trying to reclaim it. Of the 1,400 Russian and Armenian officers and soldiers defending the fort, 1,100 were killed and the survivors were injured. Nevertheless, eight assaults were repulsed by the fort and Dalangez was not given to the enemy.

On 26 May 1918, he participated in the Battle of Sardarabad as general commander of the Sardarabad unit. His cousin Poghos Bek-Pirumyan also participated in the battle as the commander of the 5th Karabakh Regiment. Daniel-Bek held the rank of lieutenant general in the army of the First Republic of Armenia. He commanded Armenian forces at the Battle of Kars and was taken prisoner by Kâzım Karabekir's army after the fall of the city. He was released from imprisonment in October 1921.

Several sources claim that Daniel-Bek Pirumyan was arrested and executed along with other officers in 1921 following the Sovietization of Armenia, either near Dilijan or in Ryazan, and that his cousin Poghos-Bek Pirumyan committed suicide after finding out about this. In reality, Pirumyan, whose health had deteriorated in Turkish captivity, died suddenly in Yerevan in the autumn of 1922, as he was preparing to leave Armenia and join his wife in Moscow. Pirumyan's remains are buried in the courtyard of Saint Gayane Church in Etchmiadzin in Armenia.

Awards
 Order of Saint Stanislaus, 2nd class
 Order of Saint Stanislaus, 3rd class
 Order of St. Anna, 2nd class
 Order of St. Anna, 3rd class
 Order of St. Anna, 4th class
 Order of St. George, 3rd class
 Order of St. Vladimir, 3rd class
 Gold Sword for Bravery

Legacy

In 2013, Yuri Pirumyan, the grandson of Daniel-Bek, published a book about his grandfather's life titled The Life of Daniel-Bek Pirumyan. Pirumyan wrote the book using archival data, noting that later historical publications contain many facts contradict each other, whereas his book contains documented historical facts.

References

Notes

Citations

External links

Outstanding people of Karabagh 
Genocide.ru 
Armenian news report about book The Life of Daniel-Bek Pirumyan
Hayazg.info 

1861 births
1921 deaths
People from Khojaly District
Imperial Russian Army personnel
Russian military personnel of World War I
Armenian colonels
Armenian people of World War I
People of the First Republic of Armenia
Recipients of the Order of Saint Stanislaus (Russian), 2nd class
Recipients of the Order of St. Anna, 2nd class
Recipients of the Order of St. Vladimir, 3rd class
Recipients of the Order of St. George of the Third Degree
Recipients of the Gold Sword for Bravery
20th-century executions by Russia
Recipients of the Order of St. Anna, 3rd class
Recipients of the Order of St. Anna, 4th class